Barry was a comedy digital radio station broadcasting to the five mainland state capital cities in Australia. The station is owned by Austereo and was the second permanent digital-only station the company has launched, alongside Radar Radio. The station was launched on 16 July 2010. It ceased operation in June 2012.

Pre-launch
The station aired a 5-minute loop on digital radio promoting the station was coming between 4 and 16 June.

Two weeks prior to the station launch on 16 July 2010, the station ran a campaign to save the name Barry from extinction. Ads aired on all Today Network and Triple M Network FM stations pointing people to savebarry.com.au.

Programming
Programming format consisted of a mix of pre-recorded and live comedy segments:

 The Peanut Gallery with Jeff Wortman & Paul Hogan (Triple M Melbourne)
 Gotcha Calls with Matt Tilley (Fox FM Melbourne)
 The Sweetest Plum (Triple M Melbourne)
 The Little Dum Dum Club with Tommy Dassalo and Karl Chandler
 Bad Blokes
 The Lunchtime Laugh
 Keith and the Girl
 Monday Night Football - (aest): Live from 6.30PM
 Stand-Up
 Song Parodies

Formerly broadcast
 Paul & Rach (Triple M Sydney)
 The Heath & Normy Show (Triple M Sydney)
 Stefan & Craig (Triple M Brisbane)
 Neville from New Zealand
 Running of the Bullsh*t with Pace & Santi (Triple M Sydney)

Availability
The station was heard on DAB+ radios in Sydney, Melbourne, Brisbane, Adelaide and Perth.

The station also streamed online at the Barry website and on the Barry iPad app.

External links 
Barry Website

References

Australian radio comedy
Defunct radio stations in Australia
Radio stations established in 2010
Radio stations disestablished in 2012
Digital radio in Australia
Digital-only radio stations